Sushila Saroj is a member of the 15th Lok Sabha of India. She represents the Mohanlalganj constituency of Uttar Pradesh and is a member of the Samajwadi Party (SP) political party. The Mohanlalganj constituency is a reserved seat for a scheduled caste.

Education and background
Saroj completed an MA, LL.B, and B.Ed from various universities in Gorakhpur, Rohilkhand, Kanpur, and Lucknow. Previously, she has been a member of the 13th Lok Sabha, a Member of the Legislative Assembly, and a Minister of State in Uttar Pradesh. She is the founder and chairperson of Virangana Udadevi Pasi Smarak Sangathan and also founded Pasi Trust.

Posts held

See also
List of members of the 15th Lok Sabha of India

References

External links 

India MPs 2009–2014
1949 births
Living people
India MPs 1999–2004
Uttar Pradesh MLAs 1993–1996
People from Gorakhpur
Lok Sabha members from Uttar Pradesh
Women in Uttar Pradesh politics
Janata Dal politicians
Samajwadi Party politicians
20th-century Indian women politicians
20th-century Indian politicians
21st-century Indian women politicians
21st-century Indian politicians
People from Sitapur district
People from Lucknow district